Maniu is a Romanian surname. Notable people with the surname include:

Adrian Maniu (1891–1968), Romanian poet, prose writer, playwright, essayist, and translator
Clara Maniu (1842–1929), Romanian feminist and suffragist
Ioan Maniu (1833–1895), Transylvanian Romanian lawyer, politician, and journalist
Iuliu Maniu (1873–1953), Austro-Hungarian-born lawyer and Romanian politician

Romanian-language surnames